Christopher Mychal Harrell (born January 29, 1983 in Euclid, Ohio) He spent brief time with the Berlin Thunder of NFL Europa, Harrell was signed to the practice squad with the Arizona Cardinals. He only ran a 4.7 and his strength  was underwhelming, but he played collegiately at Penn State University and attended Euclid High School in Euclid, Ohio.

During the 2005 season, the 6'1 I’m", 210-pound Harrell was an honorable mention All-Big Ten selection at Penn State. After sitting out 2004 with an injury suffered in practice. He helped the Nittany Lions defense in 2005, and made 88 tackles. There he earned a Bachelor of Arts in Economics in 2005.

External links
Nittany Lions' Harrell happy to regain his edge Pittsburgh Post-Gazette, April 8, 2005

1983 births
Living people
African-American players of American football
American football safeties
Arizona Cardinals players
Berlin Thunder players
Players of American football from Cleveland
Penn State Nittany Lions football players
Miami Dolphins players
People from Euclid, Ohio
21st-century African-American sportspeople
20th-century African-American people